"I'll Come Runnin" is a single by American country music artist Connie Smith.  Released in February 1967, the song reached #10 on the Billboard Hot Country Singles chart. The single was later released on Smith's first compilation album The Best of Connie Smith (1967). "I'll Come Runnin'" was the first single written entirely by Smith herself.

Chart performance

References

1967 singles
Connie Smith songs
Song recordings produced by Bob Ferguson (musician)
1967 songs
RCA Victor singles
Songs written by Connie Smith